Claudia Kristofics-Binder (born 5 October 1961) is an Austrian former figure skater. She is a two-time World bronze medalist (1981, 1982) and the 1982 European champion. She represented Austria at the 1976 and 1980 Winter Olympics. She was coached by Carlo Fassi.

She is the younger sister of Austrian figure skater Helmut Kristofics-Binder.

Results

References

1961 births
Living people
Austrian female single skaters
Figure skaters at the 1976 Winter Olympics
Figure skaters at the 1980 Winter Olympics
Figure skaters from Vienna
Olympic figure skaters of Austria
World Figure Skating Championships medalists
European Figure Skating Championships medalists